Mazatlán Futbol Club Femenil is a Mexican professional football team based in Mazatlán, Sinaloa currently playing in Liga MX Femenil. The club was established in June 2020 after the Monarcas Morelia franchise announced that it would be moving to the city of Mazatlán.

History 
On 2 June 2020 it was officially announced that Monarcas Morelia was moving to Mazatlán and that it would be rebranded as Mazatlán Futbol Club. On June 8, Mazatlán unveiled its crest and colors. The team colors are purple, black and white. 

The move of the entire club structure led to the creation of the Mazatlán women's team. In addition to most of the Monarcas Morelia staff and coaching staff as long as the people involved accepted. As part of the new team, the board appointed Jessica Castañeda as the director, who became the second woman with a managerial position in the Liga MX Femenil clubs.

On July 19, 2020 it was announced that the women's team will share the Estadio de Mazatlán with the men's branch of the club.

Personnel

Management

Coaching staff

Players

First-team squad
As of 16 July 2021

References 

Association football clubs established in 2020
2020 establishments in Mexico
Women's association football clubs in Mexico
Liga MX Femenil teams
 
Grupo Salinas
Football clubs in Sinaloa